Nimeh Kar (also Romanized as Nīmeh Kār; also known as Nīmkār) is a village in Rudkhaneh Rural District, Rudkhaneh District, Rudan County, Hormozgan Province, Iran. At the 2006 census, its population was 27, in 7 families.

References 

Populated places in Rudan County